La Margineda is an Andorran village located in the parish of Andorra la Vella. It is noted for its 12th-century Romanesque bridge, Pont de la Margineda, which is the best preserved and largest such bridge in Andorra, being 33 metres long and 9.2 metres tall.

The Instituto Español de Andorra (IEA), a Spanish international secondary school, is in La Margineda.

See also
Santa Coloma

References

Populated places in Andorra
Geography of Andorra la Vella